Larkfield may refer to several places:
Larkfield, Kent, England
Larkfield (electoral ward), of Chepstow, Wales.
the former Larkfield (Northern Ireland Parliament constituency) under the Northern Ireland Parliament constituency, abolished in 1973
Larkfield-Wikiup, California (United States of America)
Larkfield, Greenock is the largest council housing estate in Greenock, Scotland.